Lepanthes × stenosepala is a species of orchid native to Central America.

Found in Guatemala, El Salvador and Honduras at elevations around 1600 to 1800 meters as a miniature sized, cool growing epiphyte.
This species is a natural hybrid between L enca-barcenae and L tactiquensis and is intermediate in habit and flowers between the two.

References

External links 

stenosepala
Orchids of Central America
Orchid hybrids